Andrea Bosman (born 6 August 1979 in Eindhoven) is a road cyclist from the Netherlands. She participated at the UCI Road World Championships in the women's road race in 2007 and 2009. She won stages in several stage races including in the: 2008 Tour de Bretagne Féminin, 2008 Gracia–Orlová, 2009 Rabo Ster Zeeuwsche Eilanden.

References

External links
 
 
 
 

1979 births
Living people
Dutch female cyclists
UCI Road World Championships cyclists for the Netherlands
Sportspeople from Eindhoven
Cyclists from North Brabant
21st-century Dutch women